A deadeye is an item used in the standing and running rigging of traditional sailing ships.

Deadeye or dead eye may also refer to:

Arts and entertainment
 The Dead Eye, an album by The Haunted
 "Deadeye", a song by New Model Army
 Dead Eye (novel), a 2013 novel by Mark Greaney
 Dead-Eye Dick, a character in the folk ballad "The Ballad of Eskimo Nell"
 Deadeye Duck, a fictional four-armed duck in the Bucky O'Hare comic book series
 Dead-Eye, a character from the fifth season of Once Upon a Time
 the title character of the 1975 musical film Dick Deadeye, or Duty Done
 "Dead Eye", an episode of Ghost Whisperer

Other uses
 Deadeye, nickname of American ten-pin bowler Walter Ray Williams Jr.
 Dead eye (drink), a mix of coffee and espresso